Suintila, or Suinthila, Swinthila, Svinthila; (ca. 588 – 633/635) was Visigothic King of Hispania, Septimania and Galicia from 621 to 631. He was a son of Reccared I and his wife Bado, and a brother of the general Geila. Under Suintila there was an unprecedented peace and unity across the Kingdom of the Visigoths. As a direct result, by 624 the king was able to muster the forces necessary to retake those lands that had been under the control of the Eastern Roman Empire.

Life

Under the orders of King Sisebut, Suintila fought against the Byzantines, who had invaded the Iberian Peninsula in 620. The following year he was elected king, after the death of Reccared II and Sisebut. Once on the throne, Suintila secured a peace unknown in Hispania, as no foreign troops were on its soil for decades. He even managed to eject the Byzantines from their various strongholds in the Levante and according to Isidore of Seville, was the first to rule all of Spain. What Sisebut had begun by retaking Cartagena, Malaga, Sagunto, and Assidonia from the Byzantines, Suintila finished in 624 when he seized what his predecessor could not at Algarve. Byzantine power was severely weakened by Suintila's successes in the former enclave of the Eastern Empire, which was accompanied by a reduction in its standing army. Like Liuvigild before him, Suintila also attempted to bring the Basques under his command, which led to the creation of a new town named Ologicus—believed to be the site of the later Olite in Navarre—but this has yet to be confirmed by archaeologists. Isidore of Seville characterized Suintila as a man of "faith, prudence, industry, strenuousness in examination in the passing of judicial sentences, outstanding care in the exercise of rulership, munificence towards all, generosity to the poor, a disposition towards quick forgiveness; so that not only is he worthy to be called the ruler of the people but also the father of the poor."
 
Many did not share this view according to the Chronicle of Fredegar, which reports Suintila had become a hated figure; the text goes on to relate that from among the nobility through which Suintila had risen, emerged one named Sisenand, who in 631, led a rebellion in the Ebro valley after securing a promise of military aide from the Frankish king Dagobert I. The Frankish king dispatched his forces under generals Abundancio and Venerando, who once arriving at Saragossa, declared Sisenand king of the Goths. At the Fourth Council of Toledo in 633, Sisenand's seizure of power was legitimized by the Council, while Suintila was accordingly accused of various iniquities, forced to renounce his power, excommunicated, stripped of his possessions, and exiled along with his family.  

In 1858, a farmer's plough uncovered what was to become the Treasure of Guarrazar and Torredonjimero, which consisted of eleven votive crowns, three of them had names on them; these included Suintila, Reccaswinth, and Sónnica.

References

Notes

Citations

Bibliography

External links
 Coins of King Suintila

7th-century Visigothic monarchs
633 deaths
Year of birth uncertain
Year of birth unknown